Phi Kappa Psi, commonly known as Phi Psi, is an American collegiate social fraternity that was founded by William Henry Letterman and Charles Page Thomas Moore in Widow Letterman's home on the campus of Jefferson College in Canonsburg, Pennsylvania on February 19, 1852. There are over 90 chapters and colonies at accredited four year colleges and universities throughout the United States. More than 179,000 men have been initiated into Phi Kappa Psi since its founding. Phi Kappa Psi and Phi Gamma Delta, both founded at the same college, form the Jefferson Duo.

History

In the winter of 1850, a typhoid fever epidemic hit Jefferson College in Canonsburg, Pennsylvania. Many students left school. Among those who remained were William Henry Letterman and Charles Page Thomas Moore. They chose to care for their classmates who were stricken with the contagious disease, and a strong bond was formed. In the following school year, Letterman and Moore decided to found a fraternity based on "the great joy of serving others" that they experienced during the epidemic. On February 19, 1852, Phi Kappa Psi was founded.

Executive Council
The Executive Council of Phi Kappa Psi is composed of the President, Vice President, Secretary, Treasurer, and 6 Archons.

Since its founding, Phi Kappa Psi has been controlled by undergraduates. This unique system of governance is achieved by a governing body, the Executive Council, which is made up of a majority of elected undergraduates. These undergraduates, known as Archons, represent the six Districts of Phi Kappa Psi, which divide the nation into roughly equal parts based on the number of chapters represented. Archons are elected during meetings of each District during District Councils, held during odd-numbered years. Four alumni also serve on the Executive Council and are elected at Grand Arch Councils, held during even-numbered years.

Grand Chapters

Phi Kappa Psi's first form of government centered on a Grand Chapter.  One chapter at a time was designated the Grand Chapter, and it was responsible for governing the national fraternity.  This lasted until 1886 when a new constitution changed to the current form of government.

In 1992, Phi Kappa Psi began to award one exceptional chapter with the Grand Chapter Award.  Its name is derived from the fraternity's first form of government. This award was initially granted biennially at Grand Arch Councils.  2001 marked the first time that this award was granted in an odd-numbered year, and it has been an annual award ever since.

Founders

William Henry Letterman (August 12, 1832 – May 23, 1881) was born in Canonsburg, Pennsylvania. He was twenty years old when Phi Kappa Psi was founded by him and his colleague Charles Page Thomas Moore. William graduated from Jefferson College (now Washington and Jefferson College) and then went on to receive his M.D. from Jefferson Medical College in 1856, where he was president of his graduating class. His father was the physician to the town of Canonsburg and died early in William's life. He is the younger brother of Jonathan Letterman, who is known as the Father of Battlefield Medicine, whose system enabled thousands of wounded men to be recovered and treated during the American Civil War. He died on May 23, 1881, and was buried in the cemetery at Duffau, Texas.
Charles Page Thomas Moore (February 8, 1831 – July 7, 1904) was a co-founder of the Phi Kappa Psi Fraternity in 1852 at Jefferson College (now Washington and Jefferson College) in Canonsburg, Pennsylvania. He was born in Virginia in a portion of the state along the Ohio River now located in West Virginia. Moore was a justice of the West Virginia Supreme Court of Appeals, and died in West Virginia.

Organization of the fraternity

Undergraduate chapter officers

Officers may vary from each chapter with some chapters not using certain positions and others creating new positions. The duties of each officer may vary from each chapter as well. The top 9 officers (GP, VGP, AG, P, BG, SG, Hod, Phu, Hi) are common to all chapters.

GP – The GP is the President of the chapter. He presides over chapter meetings as well as other chapter activities. The GP attends both the university's Greek Leaders Retreat as well as National's President Leadership Academy, both which occur yearly. He is also responsible for the security of the charter, Ritual and ritualistic materials.
VGP (Vice President) – The VGP is the Vice President of the chapter. He works with the GP in running chapter meetings as well as other chapter activities. The VGP presides over the chapter's executive committee and works with other committees within the chapter. The VGP is also in charge of the local fraternity's Grievance Board which is in charge of assigning just punishment for misconduct that may happen amongst chapter brothers. The VGP must be prepared to take over the GP's duties if the GP were to be absent.
AG (Corresponding Secretary) – The AG is the most direct connection the chapter house has to national headquarters. The AG is in charge of writing the Chapter's semi-annual report for the National Fraternity, and also in charge of public relations for the local chapter. This means he is responsible for generating favorable publicity for Phi Kappa Psi in campus and community media.
P (Treasurer) – The P is in charge of distributing and collecting live-in contracts to the Brothers and Pledges. He keeps up to date with the house budget and makes sure everyone pays their dues on time.
BG (Recording Secretary) – The BG is in charge of the book keeping at all chapter meetings. He records the minutes of the chapter meeting and makes them available for the brothers to see afterwards.
SG (Historian) – The SG collects and documents various activities that the chapter is involved in throughout the academic year. He is in charge of scheduling pictures for the composite as well as ordering it.
Hod. – The Hod is the messenger of the chapter. He is held responsible for informing all brothers (in-house and out of house) of activities that are planned for the chapter.
Phu. – The Phu is the Sergeant-at-Arms of the chapter. He plays a diligent role in the performance and preparation chapter's semester Initiation. He also safeguards chapter meetings.
Hi. – The Hi is the chaplain of the chapter and should serve as its spiritual and moral leader. Also, he leads the chapter in prayer during meetings.
Recruitment Chairman – The Recruitment Chairman organizes the chapters rush program. He must provide the chapter with information on the rush guests and is responsible for in turn providing information to rush guests on fraternity life and expectations. He is also responsible for distributing bids to potential new members of the fraternity that the chapter deems acceptable.
The Risk Manager – Serves as a liaison between the chapter and risk management policy with the National Fraternity, the Inter-Fraternity Council, and the Office of Greek Affairs at the local University. He is also responsible for coordinating safety education to the chapter and addressing concerns related to chapter risks such as building maintenance, alcohol use, drug use, hazing and sexual abuse.
House Manager – The House Manager takes care of the maintenance, safety, and cleanliness of the chapter house. He is also responsible for closing the chapter house for breaks and reopening when classes resume.
Scholarship Chairman – The Scholarship Chairman develops and implements a scholastic program and education programs with the campus. He provides information on learning resources to the chapter, and also serves as chapter liaison with the Phi Kappa Psi foundation.
Philanthropy Chairman – The Philanthropy Chairman is in charge of coordinating and gathering the support of members for participation in other Fraternity and Sorority philanthropy events on campus.

Grand Arch Councils

The supreme governing body of Phi Kappa Psi is the Grand Arch Council (G.A.C.).  The first convened in 1853, one year after the Fraternity's founding.  They would then convene at an irregular schedule, until an entirely new form of government was ratified in 1886. Beginning in 1888, nearly all G.A.C.s have been regularly scheduled, and have occurred biennially, with the sole exceptions being that the 1944 G.A.C. was cancelled due to World War II and the 2020 G.A.C. was cancelled due to the COVID-19 epidemic.

The Order of the S.C.
The Order of the S.C., formed in 1920 at the Grand Arch Council held in Minneapolis, Minnesota, is regarded by Phi Kappa Psi as a "fraternity within a fraternity". Entrance can only be gained by performing, to the satisfaction of the Order, one or more acts of benefit to the Fraternity and attending at least seven Grand Arch Councils.  The Order meets every two years, during Phi Kappa Psi's biennial Grand Arch Council.  The words which the initials "S.C." represent are held secret by its members, and there are currently more than one hundred living members of the Order who guard its traditions and carry out its work.

Symbols
The coat of arms as adopted in 1908 has a sable (black) field, but today it is most often seen as shown at the top of this page.

The fraternity's official colors are Cardinal Red and Hunter Green.

The badge is a textured bordered shield with a lamp resting on a book at the bottom and an eye surrounded by two stars at the top. In the center of the shield are the symbols for the Greek letters Phi (Φ) Kappa (Κ) and Psi (Ψ).

The fraternity flag is in the proportions of eight and one-half feet wide by six feet high. The colors are the official fraternity colors and the design is three vertical stripes of equal width, a hunter green in the middle, flanked on either side by a cardinal red stripe.  A smaller version is available with proportions roughly three and one-half feet wide by two feet high.

The fraternity song is "Amici". Its root dates back to the traditional song "Annie Lisle".

Phi Kappa Psi Foundation
The Phi Kappa Psi Foundation was formed to aid, encourage, promote and contribute to the education and scholastic attainments of Phi Psis and other students across the country. Organized in 1914, the Phi Kappa Psi Foundation is a 501(c)(3) nonprofit, public educational foundation. As such, the Foundation is the only charitable arm of Phi Kappa Psi entitling donors to a full tax deduction within the limits set by the Internal Revenue Code.

The Foundation provides funds for a variety of programs and services which assist college students in meeting their educational objectives through scholarships, grants, fellowships and assistantships, while promoting learning, high ethical standards and constructive citizenship. Today, the Foundation has assets of over $45,000,000, making it one of the largest fraternal foundations.

Mission

The mission of the Phi Kappa Psi Foundation is to foster the development of leaders and promote academic excellence in higher education.

The Foundation is governed by 16 Trustees who serve six year terms as volunteers, at their own cost. These individuals serve on committees that are responsible for planning and implementing investment and spending strategies as well as fundraising and donor cultivation efforts. They are also committed to the idea that Phi Psi's young members are the future of the nation and need every opportunity to succeed. The Trustees bring their considerable experience in business, investing, management, planning and public relations to their stewardship and support of the Foundation.

Chapters

The Phi Kappa Psi Fraternity is composed of chapters and alumni associations, the former of which is the scope of this section.  Each chapter is chartered to an individual host institution.  These host institutions must be accredited four year degree granting colleges and universities in a state, province, territory, or federal district of Canada or the United States.  To date, chapter charters have only been granted to groups at U.S. institutions.

When Phi Kappa Psi is extending to an institution that does not currently have a chapter, a probationary group called a "colony" is formed.  After criteria are met, that colony receives its charter and becomes a chapter.

A chapter becomes inactive when it relinquishes its charter, or the charter is revoked by the fraternity, such as was the case with California Beta until its renewal.

Chapter naming convention
The chapter naming convention is composed of the top level subnational division of that chapter's host institution, and a Greek letter in alphabetical order from when the charter was originally issued.  For example, the first Phi Psi chapter is from Jefferson College in Canonsburg, Pennsylvania.  The first letter in the Greek  alphabet is Alpha.  Hence, the chapter name is Pennsylvania Alpha.  The second chapter, and first in Virginia, was installed at the University of Virginia, so it is the Virginia Alpha chapter.  The third chapter overall, and the second in Virginia, was installed at Washington & Lee University, so it is the Virginia Beta chapter.  The George Washington University chapter is the only chapter ever chartered in the District of Columbia, so it is the District of Columbia Alpha chapter.

If borders change, the chapter name does not.  Virginia Delta was chartered at Bethany College in 1859.  After the Civil War, Bethany College was in West Virginia, but the chapter remained Virginia Delta.

Chapters are named based on when the charter is granted, not when it is installed.  As a result, there have been rare instances when the chapter naming convention may not appear to be consistent with the charter dates.  For example, four charters have been granted in Iowa; the second granted was the fourth installed, so Iowa Beta was installed after Iowa Gamma and Iowa Delta.

Membership

An active member of the fraternity is a full-time enrolled student at his chapter's host institution at the undergraduate, graduate, or post-graduate level; all others, including members who have graduated or transfer to a school without a Phi Psi chapter, are considered alumni.  Men may be initiated into Phi Kappa Psi either by an active chapter, or as part of a colony that is being installed as a chapter.  Members typically join Phi Kappa Psi when a chapter extends an offer to enter into a probationary period known as pledgeship, which within the organization, and per National guidelines lasts no more than 6 weeks and concludes with initiation.

Membership is normally only granted to men who are enrolled as full-time students at a chapter's host institution.  There have been three exceptions to this:
1. Alumni of a colony which became a chapter after their graduation, and for two years after.
2. Men who have been of service to a chapter, but not students at the institution.
3. Honorary membership extended to men of prominence, a practice that was banned in 1885.

Local chapter or member misconduct
Chapters or members occasionally make news for negative or harmful choices, with situations ranging from full-on tragedies to more benign rule-breaking. Where these occur the range of outcomes can include individual and chapter suspension, lawsuits and possibly even closure. With a combination of risk management techniques, education and mentor focus, ΦΚΨ nationally has banned and renounced hazing as inconsistent with fraternity values. Despite policies put in place by the national fraternity to curtail hazing and other abusive behavior, local chapters or members have occasionally been involved in events which lead to deaths or sexual assault. The following events have been cited as impacting chapters and their communities:

In 1984, Liz Seccuro was drugged and raped at the Phi Kappa Psi house on the University of Virginia campus.  William Beebe, who was not a member of the fraternity, pled guilty to sexual battery in 2007, following a written confession he had made to Seccuro as part of his Alcoholics Anonymous program.  Two others were implicated during an investigation of the Beebe case. They retained legal counsel and invoked the Fifth Amendment when questioned before a grand jury and were ultimately not charged.

In a 2009 incident, members of the chapter were accused of stealing University of Arizona student newspapers that contained a news story about a student who alleged that she had been drugged with GHB and possibly raped while blacked out at a house party.  The homework of two chapter members was found at the same location where the stolen newspapers were discarded.  Emails from friends and relatives of Phi Kappa Psi members confirmed that the theft had been organized by the fraternity's leadership in an effort to stop the spreading of the allegations.

In 2012, as a response to repeated hazing and alcohol incidents, Phi Kappa Psi's national organization revoked the charter of the University of Arizona's chapter. The chapter was one of the fraternity's largest. The organization had closed the UCLA chapter a year earlier, over similar concerns.

In 2012, the University of Dayton suspended the fraternity for one year after an underage pledge was forced to drink an excessive amount of alcohol, leading to hospitalization.

In 2013, Cornell University placed the fraternity on interim suspension in response to serious hazing allegations.

In 2013, West Virginia University placed its chapter on suspension following an alleged hazing incident. According to the Morgantown Police Department, a 19-year-old pledge was pushed against a wall and suffered a split chin and broken teeth while doing push-ups and other hazing rituals. After a joint investigation by both the university and the national fraternity, the chapter house was closed and the chapter was suspended for five semesters.

In 2014, Butler University suspended its Phi Kappa Psi chapter for three years for alcohol violations.  Over a fourth of the student body signed a petition asking that the suspension be rescinded. In  2011, the university temporarily suspended the chapter while investigating rape allegations at a house party.

In 2014,  Brown University suspended its Phi Kappa Psi chapter after two female students reported that they rapidly became intoxicated at the fraternity's party and tested positive for the date rape drug GHB.  Chapter officials disputed the test results and a subsequent investigation by the university showed that the results were in fact inconclusive for the presence of GHB due to errors in laboratory procedures. In 2016, the female students sued the university for intentionally mishandling the case because a Brown University trustee's son was a fraternity member accused of drugging them with plans to sexually assault them.

In 2015, the Miami University chapter of Phi Kappa Psi was suspended through 2019 due to reports of hazing and inappropriate pictures taken of a party attendee that were disseminated through the popular GroupMe messaging app. Miami University suspended fraternities Sigma Nu and Kappa Sigma in the same disciplinary action.

In 2016, the University of Kentucky placed its chapter on suspension for five years following reports of hazing and alcohol abuse. Accusations included forced alcohol consumption, forced exercises in/around vomit until the pledge vomited, and forced watching of gay pornography. The chapter admitted that these and other accused hazing activities did occur.

In 2017, Matthew Ellis, a Phi Kappa Psi pledge at Texas State University, attended a fraternity event and was found unresponsive in an off-campus apartment complex the next morning.  Ellis' death led the university suspend all Greek activities on campus soon after. The chapter of Phi Kappa Psi at Texas State University had been put on suspension by the national organization a week earlier for unrelated violations. The local police placed the fraternity under investigation to determine the cause of his death.

In 2017, Creighton University suspended its chapter after an alleged hazing incident. A Phi Kappa Psi pledge slashed a female student's neck in her dorm room upon returning from an event at the fraternity's house. The nineteen-year-old pledge stated that he was forced to take drugs due to failing a pledge test, which led to the slashing. After investigation, an Omaha judge rejected the pledge's attempt to use fraternity hazing as a legal defense. The pledge pleaded no contest to felony second degree assault.

In 2017, Loyola University New Orleans suspended its chapter for two years following reports of alleged hazing. Accusations included jogging around Audubon Park in the dead of night. The university's chapter unsuccessfully appealed the suspension on the basis of "inappropriateness of the sanction", according to the university's news publication.

In 2020, on the campus of the University of Michigan, during the height of the coronavirus pandemic, a banner on the Phi Psi house urged people to remove masks, saying, "You can't eat ass with a mask on." This occurred during a back-to-school party in an attempt to encourage new pledges.

In 2020, Cornell University "permanently revoked" recognition of its chapter of Phi Kappa Psi nearly a year after a freshman student was found dead in a gorge after leaving an illegal Christmas-themed "dirty rush" party in October 2019.

In 2020, a Louisiana State University fraternity member was arrested and charged with 12 counts of misdemeanor hazing.  He forced pledges to finish drinking a large amount of purchased alcohol before leaving his home.  One pledge ended up getting so sick that he nearly died at the hospital.

University of Virginia gang rape allegation

In a since-retracted November 2014 article in Rolling Stone, Sabrina Erdely reported in detail allegations of a 2012 gang rape, and reported in brief on allegations of two subsequent gang rapes at the University of Virginia. Leaders of the fraternity conducted an internal investigation and found the allegation to be baseless. Following the story the fraternity voluntarily suspended activity there. The chapter house was also vandalized in response to the accusation. The University of Virginia suspended all fraternity activities until they signed a new agreement with the university. Several writers have criticized Erdely for not questioning the alleged rapists, including Robby Suave of Reason, Judith Shulevitz of The New Republic, and others. Rolling Stone apologized for the article, and after investigating the accusations, Phi Kappa Psi, ABC News, and The Washington Post said they had found significant discrepancies in the account.

On January 12, the University of Virginia reinstated the Phi Kappa Psi fraternity after the police investigation concluded that no incident had occurred at the fraternity. According to Charlottesville police Capt. Gary Pleasants, Phi Psi has been cleared; "We found no basis to believe that an incident occurred at that fraternity, so there's no reason to keep them suspended." That same day, the fraternity was reinstated by the University of Virginia into its Greek system.

On April 5, 2015, Rolling Stone formally retracted the story. Sabrina Erdely publicly apologized for the article on the same day.  The next day, leaders of the Phi Kappa Psi chapter announced the fraternity would file a lawsuit against Rolling Stone over the article. On July 29, 2015, a lawsuit was filed by three graduates of the fraternity Phi Kappa Psi against its publisher Wenner Media and its publisher for defamation and infliction of emotional distress.

Rolling Stone has settled the case and is paying the Phi Kappa Psi chapter at the University of Virginia $1.65 million as the result of a defamation suit.

See also
List of social fraternities and sororities

Footnotes

References

Books

Periodicals

Web

External links

National homepage
Phi Kappa Psi Foundation
Laurel Hall

 
1852 establishments in Pennsylvania
Student organizations established in 1852
North American Interfraternity Conference
Fraternities and sororities based in Indianapolis